The R120 road is a regional road in south County Dublin, Ireland.  It runs from Lucan, County Dublin to Rathcoole.

The official description of the R120 from the Roads Act 1993 (Classification of Regional Roads) Order 2012  reads:

R120: Lucan - Rathcoole - Corbally, County Dublin

Between its junction with R835 at Lucan Road in the town of Lucan and its junction with N7 at Rathcoole via Fitzmaurice Road, Adamstown Road and Lock Road in the town of Lucan; Twelfth Lock, Milltown; Peamount Cross, Newcastle; Rathcreedan, College Lane and Fitzmaurice Road all in the county of South Dublin.

See also
Roads in Ireland
National primary road
National secondary road
Regional road

References

Regional roads in the Republic of Ireland
Roads in County Dublin